Halomonas johnsoniae is a halophilic bacteria first isolated from the environment surrounding dialysis patients. It is closely related to H. magadiensis.

References

Further reading
Stevens, David A., et al. "Halomonas johnsoniae: review of a medically underappreciated genus of growing human importance." The American Journal of the Medical Sciences 345.5 (2013): 335–338.
Kim, Kwang Kyu, et al. "Halomonas stevensii sp. nov., Halomonas hamiltonii sp. nov. and Halomonas johnsoniae sp. nov., isolated from a renal care centre." International Journal of Systematic and Evolutionary Microbiology 60.2 (2010): 369–377.
Sánchez-Porro, Cristina, et al. "Halomonas titanicae sp. nov., a halophilic bacterium isolated from the RMS Titanic." International Journal of Systematic and Evolutionary Microbiology 60.12 (2010): 2768–2774.

External links

LPSN
Type strain of Halomonas johnsoniae at BacDive -  the Bacterial Diversity Metadatabase

Oceanospirillales
Bacteria described in 2009